Jonáš Forejtek and Michael Vrbenský were the defending champions but chose not to defend their title.

Francisco Cabral and Szymon Walków won the title after defeating Tristan Lamasine and Lucas Pouille 6–2, 7–6(14–12) in the final.

Seeds

Draw

References

External links
 Main draw

Sparta Prague Open - Doubles
2022 Doubles